Pietro Bonilli (15 March 1841 - 5 January 1935) was an Italian Roman Catholic priest and the founder of the Sisters of the Holy Family of Spoleto. Bonilli served as a diocesan priest for his entire life in both Trevi and Spoleto while using his order to reach out to orphans and homeless people.

Pope John Paul II beatified Bonilli on 24 April 1988.

Life
Pietro Bonilli was born in Perugia on 15 March 1841 to the farmers Sebastiano Bonilli and Maria Allegri. His mother and the local parish oversaw his initial education due to there being no school close enough for Bonilli to go to; he was a diligent student and successful in mathematical and philosophical studies.

Bonilli was ordained to the priesthood on 19 December 1863. He was appointed as the parish priest of Trevi and remained in that post until 1897. Bonilli founded his own religious congregation on 13 May 1888 in order to better care for orphans and homeless people while also providing them with a Christian and civic education. He also focused on catering to the needs of the deaf and the blind. Bonilli had four postulants enter and the latter hopefuls received their habit from the Archbishop of Spoleto Elvezio Pagliari. He also opened an orphanage for children in 1887.

He became the canon of the Spoleto Cathedral in 1898. His spiritual guide was the priest Lodovico Pieri - the latter was also the guide of Tommaso Riccardi. The congregation went on to flourish and received the papal decree of praise of Pope Pius X on 8 March 1911 while on 10 May 1932 receiving full papal approval from Pope Pius XI.

Bonilli died in 1935 after his health started to deteriorate from 1918; he had lost his sight in 1929. His remains were transferred from their previous location on 24 April 1988 due to the earthquake of 26 September 1997. His order now operates in places such as India and El Salvador. As of 2005, there were 58 houses and a total of 385 religious.

Beatification
The beatification process commenced in the Archdiocese of Spoleto-Norcia in an informative task assigned with collecting all available evidence on Bonilli's life in the form of either documents or witness testimonies that would attest to his saintliness and potential sanctification. Theologians approved all of his writings on 26 July 1953 as being in line with the tradition of the faith and not in contradiction of it.

The title of Servant of God was bestowed upon Bonilli after the cause opened on 1 July 1964 under Pope Paul VI. An apostolic process was initiated not long after and the Congregation for the Causes of Saints validated the previous processes in Rome on 16 January 1970.

The Positio was submitted to the C.C.S. in 1984 which resulted in Pope John Paul II proclaiming Bonilli to be Venerable on 30 June 1986 upon the recognition of his life of heroic virtue.

The miracle needed for beatification was investigated in a diocesan process in the place that it occurred in and received the validation of the C.C.S. on 21 June 1985. The medical board assented to the healing as being a miracle on 5 November 1986 and theologians did the same on 13 March 1987; the C.C.S. followed suit on 2 June 1987. The pope granted final approval to it a month later and beatified Bonilli on 24 April 1988.

The current postulator assigned to the cause is Giovangiuseppe Califano.

References

External links
Hagiography Circle
Sisters of the Holy Family of Spoleto

1841 births
1935 deaths
19th-century venerated Christians
19th-century Italian Roman Catholic priests
20th-century venerated Christians
20th-century Italian Roman Catholic priests
Beatifications by Pope John Paul II
Founders of Catholic religious communities
Italian beatified people
People from Perugia
Venerated Catholics by Pope John Paul II